The People vs. John Doe is a 1916 silent feature film about capital punishment co-directed by Lois Weber and Phillips Smalley. The film was released by Universal Film Manufacturing Company.

Plot 
A wealthy farmer and his sister are murdered just days after the man hired an uneducated farmhand (Harry De More).  A detective eager to collect reward money (Charles Hill Mailes) brutally forces a confession from the farmhand and his mentally disabled brother.  Both men are convicted and sentenced to death.  An attorney (Leah Baird) suspects that the men's confessions are false, tracks down the real murderer and saves the men from execution.

Cast 

 Harry De More
 Evelyn Selbie
 Willis Marks
 Leah Baird
 George Berrell
 Maude George
 Charles Hill Mailes
 Robert Smith

Production 
Lois Weber's script was based on one of the most notorious death penalty cases at the time. Like the character in her film, Charles Stielow was an uneducated farmhand unjustly accused of murder and sentenced to death.  Attorney Grace Humiston and suggest activist Inez Milholland Boissevain was instrumental in efforts to exonerate him. Weber's script was originally called "The Celebrated Stielow Case."

Release 
All references to the Charles Stielow case were removed from the film prior to release and the film's title was changed to The People vs. John Doe.  Nonethless, Universal rushed the film into release less than a week after New York governor Charles S. Whitman commuted Stielow's death sentence.  Opponents of the death penalty screened the film to draw attention to their cause in New York City and Pennsylvania.

References

Further reading

External links 

 People vs. John Doe in American Film Institute catalog
 

1916 films
American silent feature films
Films about capital punishment
1910s American films